The Government of Karnataka announced the Rajyotsava awards for the year 2015. The awardees included 60 noted eminent individuals from various fields.

List of 2015 Awardees
The Rajyotsava award winners for the year 2015 are:

Individual

Organisations/Associations

References

Rajyotsava Award
Recipients of the Rajyotsava Award 2015